Mikhail Aslanovich Pogosyan (born 18 April 1956 in Moscow, Russia) is a Russian aerospace engineer. He is the former general director of Sukhoi and the United Aircraft Corporation and the current rector of the Moscow Aviation Institute. He is a Russian national of Armenian descent.

Career
In 1979 he graduated with honors from the aircraft manufacturer faculty of the Moscow Aviation Institute and started his career at the engineering plant named after P.O. Sukhoi (now known as the JSC Sukhoi Design Bureau). He started as a designer engineer and then held the posts of the First Deputy Chief Designer (1992-1998), Chairman of Directors Board of the Design Bureau (1995-1999) and, eventually, General Director of the Sukhoi Design Bureau (starting from May 1999).

He is the author of 11 patents and inventions, 14 scientific papers, a Laureate of the State RF Prize in 1997 and Laureate of the Russian Government Prize in 1998, Doctor of Science, is a Corresponding Member of the Russian Academy of Sciences and is a Member of the Entrepreneurial Council at the Russian Government.

On 31 January 2011, he was appointed general director of United Aircraft Corporation (UAC) and replaced in January 2015.

On 16 June 2016, he was named the rector of the Moscow Aviation Institute.

External links

  Sukhoi company profile

References

Living people
1956 births
Russian people of Armenian descent
Moscow Aviation Institute alumni
Russian aerospace engineers
Soviet engineers
20th-century Russian engineers
Armenian engineers
Armenian scientists
Armenian inventors
Pogosyan
Sukhoi
Full Members of the Russian Academy of Sciences
Golden Idea national award winners